Kolijeh or Kollijah or Kelijeh may refer to:
 Kolijeh, Golestan
 Kollijah, Hamadan
 Kelijeh, West Azerbaijan